Tobias Karlsson is a Swedish figure skater. He is the 1994 Swedish national champion. As a professional skater. He has also worked as a coach. Among his current and former students are Pauline Espegren and Marie Skärgård.

Results

References

  

Swedish male single skaters
Living people
Year of birth missing (living people)
20th-century Swedish people